In Dzogchen, sky gazing (Wylie: nam mkha' ar gtad, THDL: namkha arté) is one of the core practices of trekchö as well as tögal. Dzogchen is part of the Nyingma school of Tibetan Buddhism. Detailed instructions on the practice are provided by the Nyingma teacher Tarthang Tulku, among others.

In trekchö
As sky gazing can be practised in different contexts, both trekchö and tögal, it can have multiple purposes. Like many other meditation techniques, one of the more superficial purposes is relaxation. Many people who meditate because of stress-related problems try to get out of their thoughts. Sky gazing meditation follows this intention by moving out of your thoughts, into space and emptiness. This can cause a calming effect because the practitioner learns to let go.

Lama Surya Das describes this in his book Natural Radiance:
"Through this practice of natural meditative awareness, our innate wakefulness completely unfurls and reveals itself. We gradually release our small, narrow, egotistical, dualistic minds into the non-dual, sky-like, infinite Buddha mind, while meditating on the expansive, inclusive nature of rigpa: our natural wisdom-mind and innate wakefulness. In this practice, we merge the finite, thinking heart-mind with the absolute, unconditional infinity of essential Buddha-like being."

He elaborates on that by explaining that the sky is perfect for this kind of release because of the spacious character of the sky. While our dualistic minds are concentrated on forms, the sky is an invitation to a state of formlessness. It is also a metaphor for timelessness. While the sky may have a changing content, the sky itself does not change. He also notes the connection with nature we gain from this practice. Not only with the physical nature, but our own true nature as well. This true nature will be observed because we dissolve into the open sky, showing we are one with the 'infinite'.

In The Healing Power of Mind, Tulku Thondup also mentions the power of sky gazing practice to deal with heavy emotions, by allowing them to dissolve in the open sky.

In tögal
The true nature of our mind can also be shown in various luminous and bright-coloured visualisations that are part of the tögal practice. These visions often include Tibetan symbols like deities and mandalas. This way of experiencing visions is very different from other visualisation practices as it is not 'building' a vision of any kind and does not involve instruction. In Dzogchen, the practitioners have instant visions and realisations that are not guided and the goal is to 'do' as little as possible. Dzogchen doctrine believes in natural, self-arising liberation where the meditator is just allowing and recognising the nature of mind.

The practice of sky gazing in this context leads to the four visions. These are, according to The Oxford Handbook of Meditation:

Another teaching in tögal context is called 'the six lamps.' The practitioner realises different levels of light by sky gazing. These levels are described in Tibetan Yogas of Body, Speech, and Mind to be:

Entoptic effects in the first vision
The first things a practitioner will encounter are simple patterns of luminous dots. There are a few scientific reasons why one might start to observe patterns when sky gazing. When someone is looking at a uniform image for a longer time, the brain can start to create visions because of a lack of changing input for the senses. Secondly, these visions can be caused by lights and forms from within the eye, like "darting streaks of light, slowly drifting blobs, and chains of spots that appear to race along winding pathways."

These are called entoptic lights and are divided into 'floaters' and the blue-field entoptic effect, The first one is caused by liquids and substances moving in the vitreous humor of the eye. The second is perceived as changing rapidly and are caused by white blood cells in the capillaries. These are especially visible against a blue background. The practitioner should not make these effects the centre of its attention, but let them be. These entoptic effects are described to be divine forms or introductions to the practice itself. The notion of them being divine seems more a common way to view natural appearances instead of a religious statement. It is important to note that this is not a scientific explanation for the more complex visions that may arise. These entoptic effects are explained to not be distracted by them.

As these effects can be a tool to start your visualisations, practitioners are advised to use the open sky (because of the colour) but any plain background such as a wall or ceiling.

References

Citations

Works cited

Further reading
 
 
 

Dzogchen practices
Tibetan Buddhist practices